"Red Sector A" is a song by Rush that provides a first-person account of a nameless protagonist living in an unspecified prison camp setting. "Red Sector A" first appeared on the band's 1984 album Grace Under Pressure.

Lyricist Neil Peart has stated that the detailed imagery in the song intentionally evokes concentration camps of the Holocaust, although he left the lyrics ambiguous enough that they could deal with any similar prison camp scenario.
The song was inspired in part by Geddy Lee's mother's accounts of the Holocaust.

In a rare instance for Rush's music, the track features no bass guitar, with Lee instead completely focusing on synthesizers and vocals.

Background

Geddy Lee explained the genesis of the song in an interview:

In a 1984 interview Neil Peart describes writing "Red Sector A":

Song title
The song's title "Red Sector A" comes from the name of a NASA launch area at Kennedy Space Center, where the band watched the first launch of Space Shuttle Columbia on April 12, 1981. This trip also inspired the song "Countdown", from their previous album Signals.

Track listing

See also
List of songs recorded by Rush
List of anti-war songs

References

Rock 'N' Roll Never Forgets Holocaust's Horror, Palm Beach Post, May 6, 2005

External links
 Official Rush website 
 Red Sector A video on Youtube

1984 singles
Anthem Records singles
Rush (band) songs
Songs about the Holocaust
1984 songs
Songs based on actual events
Songs written by Geddy Lee
Songs written by Alex Lifeson
Songs written by Neil Peart